The Red Castle Museum, also known as As-saraya Al-hamra Museum, the Archaeological Museum of Tripoli or Jamahiriya Museum, is a national museum in Libya. It is located in the historic building known as the Red Castle of Tripoli, sometimes also referred to as Red Saraya, on the promontory above and adjacent to the old-town district with medina Ghadema.

Designed in conjunction with UNESCO, the museum covers 5,000 years from prehistory to the independence revolution (1953) era. The museum has an entrance on historic  As-Saha al-Kradrah, the Martyrs' Square. The museum has been closed since 2011 due to security concerns.

History
The museum was established in 1919, when the colonial Italians in Libya converted a section of the castle to a museum to house many of the archaeological artifacts scattered across the country since prehistoric times. The building was renovated in the early 1920s on plans by Armando Brasini, who designed its characteristic arches. The square around the castle was designed in the thirties by architect Florestano Di Fausto. When the British occupied Libya during World War II, the museum occupied the entire complex of the castle and in 1948 was renamed The Libyan Museum. The museum reopened to the public in 1988, renamed the Assaraya Alhamra Museum–Red Castle Museum, with "state-of-the-art" facilities.

In 2011 the museum was closed due to security concerns following the Libyan Civil War and subsequent unrest. The museum remained closed as of 2020. During the 2011 war, rebels entered the museum and a few items belonging to Muammar Gaddafi were damaged. The most valuable items were kept safe at another location by the museum staff. The remaining items relating to Gaddafi were placed in storage by the staff.

Collections
The museum was designed with different wings and floors for the exhibition of the distinct collections.

 Prehistory of the Libyan region
 Ancient Libyan tribes and traditions – the Maghreb Berbers: Garamentes, Tuareg, and others
 Libyan culture during the Phoenician–Punic–Greek–Roman Libya–Byzantine–Ottoman Tripolitania-era traditions
 Islamic architecture
 Italian Libya, World War II, Libyan independence and 20th-century Libyan heritage
 Natural history of the Libyan region

Gallery

See also

 Zliten mosaic
 History of Islamic Tripolitania and Cyrenaica
 History of Libya
 List of museums in Libya

References

Archaeological museums in Libya
Forts in Libya
History museums
Museums established in 1919
Museums in Tripoli, Libya
Natural history museums